Marietta Kurz was the first person to find evidence of the subatomic particles known as mesons, specifically pions.

Kurz was employed by Cecil Powell's research team at the University of Bristol as a "scanner", tasked to search for the tracks left by subatomic events recorded in photographic plates. The plates had been lofted to high altitudes to increase the possibility of recording decay events from the shower of particles from cosmic rays interacting with the nuclei of atoms in the atmosphere. On 7 March 1947, while inspecting a plate, she noticed through her microscope a track of silver particles that showed a meson stopping and another one continuing from where the first had terminated. She recorded this with a sketch in her notebook and the words "double meson" in capitals. Powell and Hugh Muirhead immediately realised the significance. Though the decay event was clear, the resultant track was incomplete, having left the edge of the plate. Following instructions to the team to search for such events, further ones were discovered within days with a complete resultant track having a length of about 600 micrometres found by Kurz's colleague, Irene Roberts; these tracks allowed the new pion particle's mass to be determined, providing the substance for a paper submitted to Nature by César Lattes, Hugh Muirhead, Giuseppe Occhialini, and Powell. Kurz was credited in the caption for the original track's image. Powell was awarded the Nobel Prize in 1950.

Legacy
Kurz's notebook is now displayed as part of the University of Bristol's Special Collections.

References

20th-century British women scientists
British women physicists
British physicists
People associated with the University of Bristol
Year of birth missing
Year of death missing